Bulgarian Energy Holding EAD (BEH EAD) is a state owned energy holding company in Bulgaria. It was incorporated on 18 September 2008 after renaming Bulgargaz Holding EAD.  In November 2009, the Bulgarian Government decided to list the company at the Bulgarian Stock Exchange – Sofia.

It is the owner of the  Maritsa Iztok-2 power station. This power station was ranked as the industrial facility that is causing the highest damage costs to health and the environment in Bulgaria and the entire European Union in November 2014 by the European Environment Agency.

Subsidiaries
BEH EAD has following subsidiaries:
Mini Maritsa Iztok EAD
Maritsa East 2 TPP EAD
Kozloduy NPP EAD
NEK EAD
Electricity System Operator EAD
Bulgargaz EAD
Bulgartransgaz EAD
Bulgartel EAD

References

External links

Company website

Energy companies of Bulgaria
Government-owned companies of Bulgaria
Bulgarian companies established in 2008
Energy companies established in 2008
Oil and gas companies of Bulgaria